Fort Augustaborg was a Danish fort on the eastern Gold Coast in present-day Ghana, which was located about 15 km east of Fort Christiansborg near present-day Teshie.

History 
The fort was named for Princess Louise Augusta of Denmark, the fort was constructed in 1787 to combat attacks from the Portuguese Empire. It was also used as a post for the Atlantic slave trade. Five years later, Denmark was the first European nation to abolish the slave trade.

On 17 August 1850, the fort was one of five Danish forts purchased by Queen Victoria.

After the independence of Ghana in 1957, the fort became owned by the new administration. Along with 32 other forts and castles along Ghana’s coast, Fort Augusaborg is a UNESCO World Heritage Site.

Gallery

References

See also 

 List of castles in Ghana

1787 establishments in Africa
1780s architecture
Castles in Ghana
Danish Gold Coast
Forts in Ghana
Former buildings and structures in Ghana
1787 establishments in the Danish colonial empire
Greater Accra Region
World Heritage Sites in Ghana